The R. G. Menzies House, also known colloquially as Liberal Headquarters, or simply Menzies House, is the official headquarters of the Australian Federal Liberal Party. It is also home to the party's think tank, the Menzies Research Centre. It was built in the Georgian architectural-style and is described as a "two-floored, red-brick house." It is located in the Canberra suburb of Barton, less than one kilometre from Parliament House.

The building was reported to have cost AU£65,000 and was opened by then-Prime Minister Robert Menzies on 9 November 1965. Headquarters for the Federal Liberal Party, it currently houses the "Federal Secretariat" of the party and staff of the Menzies Research Centre. After renovation in 1994 the building was re-opened by Robert Menzies' wife Pattie and had its name changed to R. G. Menzies House. The revamped building cost AU$1.5 million.

At the entrance front of the building is a bust of Menzies. The bust was sculpted by Melbourne sculptor V. E. Greenhalgh.

Gallery

References
Notes

Citations

Headquarters of political parties
Liberal Party of Australia